Isabel Camila Masiero (born in Mendoza, Argentina), better known by her stage name Princesa Yamal, is a Mexican vedette, actress  and dancer of Argentine origin. She was one of the most popular Mexican vedettes during the 1970s and 1980s.

Career 
She arrived to Mexico in 1977 contracted by Ramón Bugarini, famous businessman of the time. At that time she worked in Panama, where she starred as main star in the famous Playboy nightclub. Before settling in Mexico, she had offers to work in Japan, Milan and Miami. She refused to work in Italy, since one of her uncles was a priest in that country.<ref>[https://www.youtube.com/watch?v=DCca6gSTvyA YouTube: La historia detrás del mito, Mexican Vedettes TV Azteca, México]</ref>
She debuted in Mexico City in the famous nightclub El 77, sharing credits with the also vedette Amira Cruzat. The show of PrincesaYamal was different from those presented in Mexico at that time. Her specialty was the Arab dances. Yamal is an Arabic word meaning beauty.
She also participated in some films of the called Mexican sex comedy, as well in the popular magazines of that time.

In 1985, the vedette was involved in the robbery of the National Museum of Anthropology of Mexico and purged a two-year prison sentence.

Currently, Princesa Yamal is located in Acapulco, where she perform beauty treatments.

In 2016, Princesa Yamal, along with other vedettes like Olga Breeskin, Rossy Mendoza, Lyn May and Wanda Seux stars in the documentary film Beauties of the Night, by the filmmaker María José Cuevas. In fact, Cuevas revealed that it was a meeting that she had with Princesa Yamal in 2006, which motivated her to realize the film project.

Filmography
Films
 Carnival Nights (1978)
 La vida difícil de una mujer fácil (1979)
 Las nenas del amor (1983)
 Macho que ladra no muerde (1984)
 Los plomeros y las ficheras (1988)
 El rey de las ficheras (1989)
 A garrote limpio (1989)
 Beauties of the Night (2016)

Television
 Variedades de medianoche'' (1977)

References

External links 
 

Argentine emigrants to Mexico
Living people
Burlesque performers
Mexican female dancers
Mexican film actresses
Mexican vedettes
People from Mendoza, Argentina
Year of birth missing (living people)